Hilda Borko is an educational psychologist who researches teacher cognition and changes in novice and experienced teachers' knowledge and beliefs.Her research explores teachers’ instructional practices, the process of learning to teach, the impact of teacher professional development programs on teachers and students, and the preparation of professional development leaders. Her work has identified factors that affect teachers' learning of reform-based practices. She is chair of the educational psychology program area in the school of education at the University of Colorado, and is a former president of the American Educational Research Association. Her university education (PhD 1978, MA 1973, BA 1971) was completed at the University of California.

References

External links
 Hilda Borko bio

Living people
American women psychologists
American educational psychologists
University of California, Berkeley alumni
University of Colorado faculty
Year of birth missing (living people)
American women academics
21st-century American women
American psychologists